This is a list of butterflies found in Metropolitan France (including Corsica).

Hesperiidae 
Carcharodus alceae (Esper, 1780)
Carcharodus baeticus (Rambur, 1839)
Carcharodus floccifera (Zeller, 1847)
Carcharodus lavatherae (Esper, 1783)
Carterocephalus palaemon (Pallas, 1771)
Erynnis tages (Linnaeus, 1758)
Gegenes pumilio (Hoffmannsegg, 1804)
Hesperia comma (Linnaeus, 1758)
Heteropterus morpheus (Pallas, 1771)
Muschampia proto (Ochsenheimer, 1808)
Ochlodes sylvanus (Esper, 1777)
Pyrgus alveus (Hübner, 1803)
Pyrgus andromedae (Wallengren, 1853)
Pyrgus armoricanus (Oberthur, 1910)
Pyrgus bellieri (Oberthur, 1910)
Pyrgus cacaliae (Rambur, 1839)
Pyrgus carlinae (Rambur, 1839)
Pyrgus carthami (Hübner, 1813)
Pyrgus cirsii (Rambur, 1839)
Pyrgus malvae (Linnaeus, 1758)
Pyrgus malvoides (Elwes & Edwards, 1897)
Pyrgus onopordi (Rambur, 1839)
Pyrgus serratulae (Rambur, 1839)
Pyrgus sidae (Esper, 1784)
Pyrgus warrenensis (Verity, 1928)
Spialia sertorius (Hoffmannsegg, 1804)
Spialia therapne (Rambur, 1832)
Thymelicus acteon (Rottemburg, 1775)
Thymelicus lineola (Ochsenheimer, 1808)
Thymelicus sylvestris (Poda, 1761)

Lycaenidae
Agriades glandon (de Prunner, 1798)
Agriades optilete (Knoch, 1781)
Agriades orbitulus (de Prunner, 1798)
Agriades pyrenaicus (Boisduval, 1840)
Aricia agestis (Denis & Schiffermuller, 1775)
Aricia artaxerxes (Fabricius, 1793)
Aricia morronensis (Ribbe, 1910)
Aricia nicias (Meigen, 1830)
Cacyreus marshalli Butler, 1898
Callophrys avis Chapman, 1909
Callophrys rubi (Linnaeus, 1758)
Celastrina argiolus (Linnaeus, 1758)
Cupido minimus (Fuessly, 1775)
Cupido osiris (Meigen, 1829)
Cupido alcetas (Hoffmannsegg, 1804)
Cupido argiades (Pallas, 1771)
Cyaniris semiargus (Rottemburg, 1775)
Eumedonia eumedon (Esper, 1780)
Favonius quercus (Linnaeus, 1758)
Glaucopsyche alexis (Poda, 1761)
Glaucopsyche melanops (Boisduval, 1828)
Iolana iolas (Ochsenheimer, 1816)
Laeosopis roboris (Esper, 1789)
Lampides boeticus (Linnaeus, 1767)
Leptotes pirithous (Linnaeus, 1767)
Lycaena alciphron (Rottemburg, 1775)
Lycaena dispar (Haworth, 1802)
Lycaena helle (Denis & Schiffermuller, 1775)
Lycaena hippothoe (Linnaeus, 1761)
Lycaena phlaeas (Linnaeus, 1761)
Lycaena tityrus (Poda, 1761)
Lycaena virgaureae (Linnaeus, 1758)
Lysandra bellargus (Rottemburg, 1775)
Lysandra coridon (Poda, 1761)
Lysandra hispana (Herrich-Schäffer, [1851])
Phengaris alcon (Denis & Schiffermuller, 1775)
Phengaris arion (Linnaeus, 1758)
Phengaris nausithous (Bergstrasser, 1779)
Phengaris rebeli (Hirschke, 1904)
Phengaris teleius (Bergstrasser, 1779)
Plebejus argus (Linnaeus, 1758)
Plebejus argyrognomon (Bergstrasser, 1779)
Plebejus bellieri (Oberthur, 1910)
Plebejus idas (Linnaeus, 1761)
Polyommatus damon (Denis & Schiffermuller, 1775)
Polyommatus dolus (Hübner, 1823)
Polyommatus ripartii (Freyer, 1830)
Polyommatus daphnis (Denis & Schiffermuller, 1775)
Polyommatus amandus (Schneider, 1792)
Polyommatus dorylas (Denis & Schiffermuller, 1775)
Polyommatus eros (Ochsenheimer, 1808)
Polyommatus escheri (Hübner, 1823)
Polyommatus icarus (Rottemburg, 1775)
Polyommatus thersites (Cantener, 1835)
Pseudophilotes baton (Bergstrasser, 1779)
Satyrium acaciae (Fabricius, 1787)
Satyrium esculi (Hübner, 1804)
Satyrium ilicis (Esper, 1779)
Satyrium pruni (Linnaeus, 1758)
Satyrium spini (Denis & Schiffermuller, 1775)
Satyrium w-album (Knoch, 1782)
Scolitantides orion (Pallas, 1771)
Thecla betulae (Linnaeus, 1758)
Tomares ballus (Fabricius, 1787)

Nymphalidae
Aglais ichnusa (Bonelli, 1826)
Aglais io (Linnaeus, 1758)
Aglais urticae (Linnaeus, 1758)
Apatura ilia (Denis & Schiffermuller, 1775)
Apatura iris (Linnaeus, 1758)
Aphantopus hyperantus (Linnaeus, 1758)
Araschnia levana (Linnaeus, 1758)
Arethusana arethusa (Denis & Schiffermuller, 1775)
Argynnis paphia (Linnaeus, 1758)
Argynnis pandora (Denis & Schiffermuller, 1775)
Boloria aquilonaris (Stichel, 1908)
Boloria graeca (Staudinger, 1870)
Boloria napaea (Hoffmannsegg, 1804)
Boloria pales (Denis & Schiffermuller, 1775)
Boloria dia (Linnaeus, 1767)
Boloria euphrosyne (Linnaeus, 1758)
Boloria selene (Denis & Schiffermuller, 1775)
Boloria titania (Esper, 1793)
Boloria eunomia (Esper, 1799)
Brenthis daphne (Bergstrasser, 1780)
Brenthis hecate (Denis & Schiffermuller, 1775)
Brenthis ino (Rottemburg, 1775)
Brintesia circe (Fabricius, 1775)
Charaxes jasius (Linnaeus, 1767)
Chazara briseis (Linnaeus, 1764)
Coenonympha arcania (Linnaeus, 1761)
Coenonympha corinna (Hübner, 1804)
Coenonympha dorus (Esper, 1782)
Coenonympha gardetta (de Prunner, 1798)
Coenonympha glycerion (Borkhausen, 1788)
Coenonympha hero (Linnaeus, 1761)
Coenonympha oedippus (Fabricius, 1787)
Coenonympha pamphilus (Linnaeus, 1758)
Coenonympha tullia (Muller, 1764)
Danaus chrysippus (Linnaeus, 1758)
Danaus plexippus (Linnaeus, 1758)
Erebia aethiopellus (Hoffmannsegg, 1806)
Erebia aethiops (Esper, 1777)
Erebia alberganus (de Prunner, 1798)
Erebia cassioides (Reiner & Hochenwarth, 1792)
Erebia epiphron (Knoch, 1783)
Erebia epistygne (Hübner, 1819)
Erebia euryale (Esper, 1805)
Erebia gorge (Hübner, 1804)
Erebia gorgone Boisduval, 1833
Erebia lefebvrei (Boisduval, 1828)
Erebia ligea (Linnaeus, 1758)
Erebia manto (Denis & Schiffermuller, 1775)
Erebia medusa (Denis & Schiffermuller, 1775)
Erebia melampus (Fuessly, 1775)
Erebia meolans (Prunner, 1798)
Erebia mnestra (Hübner, 1804)
Erebia montanus (de Prunner, 1798)
Erebia neoridas (Boisduval, 1828)
Erebia oeme (Hübner, 1804)
Erebia ottomana Herrich-Schäffer, 1847
Erebia pandrose (Borkhausen, 1788)
Erebia pharte (Hübner, 1804)
Erebia pluto (de Prunner, 1798)
Erebia pronoe (Esper, 1780)
Erebia rondoui Oberthur, 1908
Erebia scipio Boisduval, 1832
Erebia sthennyo Graslin, 1850
Erebia sudetica Staudinger, 1861
Erebia triarius (de Prunner, 1798)
Euphydryas aurinia (Rottemburg, 1775)
Euphydryas cynthia (Denis & Schiffermuller, 1775)
Euphydryas desfontainii (Godart, 1819)
Euphydryas intermedia (Menetries, 1859)
Euphydryas maturna (Linnaeus, 1758)
Fabriciana adippe (Denis & Schiffermuller, 1775)
Fabriciana elisa (Godart, [1824])
Fabriciana niobe (Linnaeus, 1758)
Hipparchia fagi (Scopoli, 1763)
Hipparchia genava (Fruhstorfer, 1908)
Hipparchia hermione (Linnaeus, 1764)
Hipparchia neomiris (Godart, 1822)
Hipparchia statilinus (Hufnagel, 1766)
Hipparchia aristaeus (Bonelli, 1826)
Hipparchia semele (Linnaeus, 1758)
Hipparchia fidia (Linnaeus, 1767)
Hyponephele lupinus (O. Costa, 1836)
Hyponephele lycaon (Rottemburg, 1775)
Issoria lathonia (Linnaeus, 1758)
Lasiommata maera (Linnaeus, 1758)
Lasiommata megera (Linnaeus, 1767)
Lasiommata paramegaera (Hübner, 1824)
Lasiommata petropolitana (Fabricius, 1787)
Libythea celtis (Laicharting, 1782)
Limenitis camilla (Linnaeus, 1764)
Limenitis populi (Linnaeus, 1758)
Limenitis reducta Staudinger, 1901
Lopinga achine (Scopoli, 1763)
Maniola jurtina (Linnaeus, 1758)
Melanargia galathea (Linnaeus, 1758)
Melanargia lachesis (Hübner, 1790)
Melanargia occitanica (Esper, 1793)
Melanargia russiae (Esper, 1783)
Melitaea athalia (Rottemburg, 1775)
Melitaea aurelia Nickerl, 1850
Melitaea cinxia (Linnaeus, 1758)
Melitaea deione (Geyer, 1832)
Melitaea diamina (Lang, 1789)
Melitaea didyma (Esper, 1778)
Melitaea ignasiti Sagarra, 1926
Melitaea parthenoides Keferstein, 1851
Melitaea phoebe (Denis & Schiffermuller, 1775)
Melitaea varia Meyer-Dur, 1851
Minois dryas (Scopoli, 1763)
Nymphalis antiopa (Linnaeus, 1758)
Nymphalis polychloros (Linnaeus, 1758)
Nymphalis xanthomelas (Esper, 1781)
Oeneis glacialis (Moll, 1783)
Pararge aegeria (Linnaeus, 1758)
Polygonia c-album (Linnaeus, 1758)
Polygonia egea (Cramer, 1775)
Pyronia bathseba (Fabricius, 1793)
Pyronia cecilia (Vallantin, 1894)
Pyronia tithonus (Linnaeus, 1767)
Satyrus actaea (Esper, 1781)
Satyrus ferula (Fabricius, 1793)
Speyeria aglaja (Linnaeus, 1758)
Vanessa atalanta (Linnaeus, 1758)
Vanessa cardui (Linnaeus, 1758)
Vanessa virginiensis (Drury, 1773)

Papilionidae
Iphiclides feisthamelii (Duponchel, 1832)
Iphiclides podalirius (Linnaeus, 1758)
Papilio alexanor Esper, 1800
Papilio hospiton Guenee, 1839
Papilio machaon Linnaeus, 1758
Parnassius apollo (Linnaeus, 1758)
Parnassius mnemosyne (Linnaeus, 1758)
Parnassius phoebus (Fabricius, 1793)
Zerynthia polyxena (Denis & Schiffermuller, 1775)
Zerynthia rumina (Linnaeus, 1758)

Pieridae
Anthocharis cardamines (Linnaeus, 1758)
Anthocharis euphenoides Staudinger, 1869
Aporia crataegi (Linnaeus, 1758)
Colias alfacariensis Ribbe, 1905
Colias croceus (Fourcroy, 1785)
Colias hyale (Linnaeus, 1758)
Colias palaeno (Linnaeus, 1761)
Colias phicomone (Esper, 1780)
Euchloe crameri Butler, 1869
Euchloe insularis (Staudinger, 1861)
Euchloe simplonia (Freyer, 1829)
Euchloe tagis (Hübner, 1804)
Gonepteryx cleopatra (Linnaeus, 1767)
Gonepteryx rhamni (Linnaeus, 1758)
Leptidea duponcheli (Staudinger, 1871)
Leptidea juvernica Williams, 1946
Leptidea reali Reissinger, 1990
Leptidea sinapis (Linnaeus, 1758)
Pieris brassicae (Linnaeus, 1758)
Pieris bryoniae (Hübner, 1806)
Pieris ergane (Geyer, 1828)
Pieris mannii (Mayer, 1851)
Pieris napi (Linnaeus, 1758)
Pieris rapae (Linnaeus, 1758)
Pontia callidice (Hübner, 1800)
Pontia daplidice (Linnaeus, 1758)

Riodinidae
Hamearis lucina (Linnaeus, 1758)

See also
List of moths of Metropolitan France (A–C)
List of moths of Metropolitan France (D–H)
List of moths of Metropolitan France (I–O)
List of moths of Metropolitan France (P–Z)
Fauna of Metropolitan France

References 

 
Metropolitan France
Butterflies
France